"She Says" is a song by the San Diego-based rock band Unwritten Law, released as the second single from the band's 2005 album Here's to the Mourning. It was written by singer Scott Russo along with Aimee Allen and Phil Jamieson, and was produced by Sean Beavan. It reached #32 on Billboard's Alternative Songs chart.

Track listing

Personnel

Band
Scott Russo - lead vocals
Steve Morris - lead guitar, backing vocals
Rob Brewer - rhythm guitar, backing vocals
Pat "PK" Kim - bass guitar
Tony Palermo - drums on "She Says" and "Get Up"

Additional musicians
Adrian Young – drums on "F.I.G.H.T."
Ben Rosen - programming

Production
Sean Beavan – producer, engineer, mixing
Critter and Zach Barnhorst – engineers
Zach Barnhorst, Jay Groin, James Murray, and Alex Pavlides – assistant engineers
Brain Gardener – mastering

References

2005 singles
Unwritten Law songs
Music videos directed by Jessy Terrero
Songs written by Aimee Allen
Songs written by Phil Jamieson
2004 songs